The Royal Affair Tour: Live from Las Vegas is a live album by progressive rock band Yes, released on 30 October 2020 by BMG. It documents the group's performance on 26 July 2019 at The Joint in Las Vegas, Nevada, during their Royal Affair Tour.

Background

The album was recorded on 26 July 2019 at The Joint in Las Vegas, Nevada, during Yes' Royal Affair Tour. Two songs from the concert do not appear on the album: "Country Mix" (an acoustic guitar solo by Steve Howe) and "The Gates of Delirium".

Track listing

Personnel
Yes
 Steve Howe – guitars, backing vocals
 Alan White – drums, percussion
 Billy Sherwood – bass guitar, backing vocals, harmonica, mixing
 Geoff Downes – keyboards
 Jon Davison – lead vocals, acoustic guitar, percussion

with
 Jay Schellen – additional drums, percussion
 John Lodge - guest vocals on "Imagine"

Production
 Maor Appelbaum – Mastering Engineer
 Roger Dean – artwork

References

2020 live albums
Yes (band) live albums
BMG Rights Management albums
Albums with cover art by Roger Dean (artist)